Grietje "Greta" Smit (born 20 January 1976) is a Dutch former speed skater.

Smit won a surprising silver medal in the 2002 Winter Olympics in the 5000 meter event. She skated a world record broken in a later pair by Claudia Pechstein. Prior to that season, she had not competed in long track speed skating competitions for several years, and had only taken up practice again shortly before the Dutch trials in late 2001.

However, she had been a very successful marathon skater in the years before 2002. She had become Dutch marathon skating champion on natural ice in 1995, 1998, 2000 and 2001, and on artificial ice in 1999, 2000 and 2001. During the last held Elfstedentocht in 1997 she finished second. She also won the alternative Elfstedentocht - skated in Finland - in 1998, 2000 and 2001.

Smit's two sisters, Jenita and Marianne, were also good (marathon) skaters; Jenita also took up long track skating in the 2002/2003 season.

Personal records

References

External links
Official website (in Dutch) 

 
 

1976 births
Living people
People from Staphorst
Olympic speed skaters of the Netherlands
Olympic silver medalists for the Netherlands
Speed skaters at the 2002 Winter Olympics
Speed skaters at the 2006 Winter Olympics
Olympic medalists in speed skating
Dutch female speed skaters
Medalists at the 2002 Winter Olympics
20th-century Dutch women
21st-century Dutch women
Sportspeople from Overijssel